Emma Catherine Rigby (born 26 September 1989) is an English actress. After rising to prominence for her role as Hannah Ashworth in Hollyoaks, she later played Gemma Roscoe in the BBC One drama series Prisoners' Wives and as the Red Queen in the American fantasy-drama Once Upon a Time in Wonderland. She also played the lead role of Angie in Movies 24's A Cinderella Christmas, directed by Tosca Musk.

Early life
Rigby was born in St Helens, Merseyside, she attended De La Salle High School, where she gained 10 A* at GCSE. Rigby began working professionally at the age of 14.

Career
Rigby's television debut came in June 2003 as Lisa Gunstone in the BBC's drama series Born and Bred. She also played Elena Jones, schoolfriend of Anthony Murray (Raymond Quinn), in four episodes of the Channel 4 soap Brookside in the same year.

In 2005, at the age of 15, Rigby was cast as Hannah Ashworth in Hollyoaks. She received praise and recognition for her character's anorexia storyline, in which she was nominated for various awards, including winning the British Soap Award for Best Actress in 2008.

In 2008, Rigby announced she was leaving Hollyoaks in November to pursue other projects, and would remain on-screen until June 2009. However, after meetings with soap bosses, Rigby extended her contract for an additional six months and remained on-screen until February 2010. Her final episode was broadcast on 11 February 2010.

In 2010, Rigby made her debut in the West End thriller musical Wolfboy. She had a non-singing part, playing the role of nurse Cherry. She received positive feedback from critics. Rigby has modelled for over a decade, shooting a campaign with the photographer Rory Lewis in late February 2010. From 2009–2011 she starred in several short films, including the award-winning Talk.

In 2011, Rigby starred as Brandy Mulligan in online series Becoming Human. The same year, she appeared in the horror film Demons Never Die, and in September she had a role in the first episode of the C4 comedy Fresh Meat as Rachel.

In 2012 Rigby starred in the six-part drama series Prisoners' Wives, along with Jonas Armstrong. The show's first episode aired on 31 January 2012. Rigby played Gemma Roscoe, a young pregnant girl whose life falls apart when her husband is arrested for murder. In March 2012, she had a guest role in Pramface as Mike's blind date Carrie-Ann. In June 2012, it was announced that she had scored the female lead in The Physician alongside Ben Kingsley. The film was released in late 2013. Also in 2013, she made her US film debut with a role in the Ridley Scott film The Counsellor.

In 2013, Rigby appeared in episode four of Ripper Street as Lucy Eames, and in episode one of The Job Lot. In April 2013 Rigby was cast in a lead role as the Red Queen in the U.S. television series Once Upon a Time in Wonderland.
In 2014 she starred in the remake of Endless Love and also played the female lead in the British crime film Plastic which is based on a true story, about a group of English university students running a successful credit card scam.

In 2015, Rigby worked alongside James Franco in the movie adaptation of his book Actors Anonymous. It was released in 2017.

In 2016 Rigby made a return to British television after a three-year absence, with a guest appearance on Death in Paradise. Also in 2016 she had a minor role in the US television remake of Mother, May I Sleep with Danger? which premiered on Lifetime on 18 June. In the summer of 2016, Rigby signed on for her first female lead in a US film, starring as Angie in romantic comedy A Cinderella Christmas. It was filmed during that summer and released in December of the same year. She also shot American crime thriller drama American Violence, playing Olivia Rose, which was released in early 2017.

In 2017, Rigby starred as the female lead in Hollywood Dirt which released on Passionflix in September. In May, Rigby appeared in the first episode of the final series of Inspector George Gently as Betty Platt. In September, Rigby joined the cast of comedy film The Festival. She played Smurf Girl and the film was released in 2018.

In 2018, Rigby guest starred in the first two episodes of Sky One's Bulletproof. In October, Rigby joined the cast of the West End production of Agatha Christie's Witness for the Prosecution. Rigby played Romaine Vole in the play, and made her first appearance in the role at London's County Hall on 20 November 2018 and her final appearance on 26 May 2019.

In 2019, Rigby appeared in A Guide to Second Date Sex as Tufts.

In 2020, she joined the cast of BBC Three's television film Make Me Famous.

In 2021, she had a featured role in the horror film The Power, as Babs.

Personal life
Rigby was on FHM's 100 Sexiest Women of 2015.

Rigby is an ambassador for the Catholic Agency for Overseas Development CAFOD. and for the Douai Foundation.

Filmography

Stage

Awards and nominations

In 2007, at the age of 17, Rigby was nominated for Best Actress in the British Soap Awards (being one year too old to qualify for Best Dramatic Performance for a Young Actor/Actress), but did not make it to the final four. She was also nominated for Most Popular Actress at the National Television Awards. A year later, she won The British Soap Award for Best Actress and was nominated for Best Dramatic Performance, but lost to Jo Joyner.

Her portrayal of Hannah Ashworth's battle with anorexia attracted praise. She won best storyline for Hannah's eating disorder at the annual Hollyoaks awards. She was up against John Paul and Craig's affair, the "Who pushed Clare?" storyline, and Kris and Jess's relationship. At the All About Soap Bubble Awards in April 2008, Rigby won an award for the 'I'm a Survivor' (for the bravest soul in soap)  category.

References

External links
 
 
 

1989 births
Living people
English soap opera actresses
English television actresses
People from St Helens, Merseyside
Actresses from Merseyside
21st-century English actresses
English film actresses
English child actresses
English female models
English Roman Catholics